Contacts is a computerized address book included with the Apple operating systems iOS, iPadOS, watchOS and macOS, previously Mac OS X and OS X. It includes various cloud synchronization capabilities and integrates with other Apple applications and features, including iMessage, FaceTime and the iCloud service (and previously its predecessor MobileMe).

History
An application known as Address Book was included with Mac OS X from its release in 2001 and in preceding beta versions. Address Book was rewritten for Mac OS X Jaguar (2002) and as of 2020 has remained in roughly the same form ever since. 

The iPhone also included contacts storage from its release, which starting from iPhone OS 2 (2008) was also broken out into a standalone application. In 2010, the iPad with iOS 3.2 introduced a new two-pane contacts app, featuring the skeuomorphic design style popular with Apple around this time under the leadership of Scott Forstall.

OS X Lion (2011) featured a redesigned Address Book application in the style of the iPad Contacts app, also in a two-pane design. In 2012 with OS X Mountain Lion it returned to a three-pane design and changed names to match iOS. 

The following year, both versions of Contacts switched with their parent operating systems to a more flat design style, a change attributed to Forstall's departure from Apple in the autumn of 2012. In 2013 iOS Contacts switched to the new UI along with the whole of iOS 7, while with OS X Mavericks the skeuomorphic design was removed leaving a basic UI. With OS X Yosemite (2014) the OS X Contacts app switched along with the rest of the operating system to the iOS 7-style UI.

In 2021, Apple introduced Contacts to Apple Watch in watchOS 8.

Features
Exports and imports cards in vCard 3.0 format
Imports cards from LDIF, tab-delimited, and comma-separated files
C and Objective-C API to interface with other applications
Prints labels and envelopes, mailing lists, pocket address books
Can configure page setup and paper size before printing
One-click automatic look up for duplicate entries
Change of address notification
Contact groups
Smart groups based on Spotlight
Look up addresses on Apple Maps
Auto-merge when importing vCards
Customize fields and categories
Automatic formatting of phone numbers
Synchronizes with Microsoft Exchange Server
Synchronizes with Yahoo! Address Book
Synchronizes with Google Contact Sync
Speech recognition searching
Capability to query an LDAP database containing person information
Plugin interface allowing third-party developers to add functionality to the program

Integration with macOS
Integration with Mail, iCal, iChat, Fax, Safari, iPhone
iSync compatibility to sync contacts to phones, PDAs, iPods, and other Macs
Contacts are indexed by Spotlight
Address Book stores previous recipient addresses used by Mail
URLs in Address Book cards appear in Safari's Address Book bookmarks
Buddies in iChat can be associated with Address Book cards
Birthdays saved in Address Book appear in iCal if enabled
Address Book Dashboard Widget
AppleScript support for querying, adding, modifying, and removing people and groups

User interface
Contacts has two viewing modes: View Card and Column and View Card Only. The user can switch between modes with a control in the upper-left portion of the window under the close box.

In releases prior to Lion, in View Card and Column, the Contacts window is divided into three panes. The first pane has the title Group. This pane lists All, Directories, and each user-made group. Users can add new groups by pulling the File menu down to New Group, or typing Command-Shift-N.

When selecting All or a user-made group, the second column has the title Name. It lists the names of the people with cards in that group, or all the names if the selected group is All, in alphabetical order by first or last name, depending on user preference.

The third pane has the card corresponding to the selected name. The card can include information, some of which the user can classify into customizable categories like Home and Work. Many of the fields can have duplicate entries, for example, if the person the card describes has several email addresses. The user can edit the fields by pressing the edit button below the bottom-left of the third pane. Default fields include:

Picture
Name pronunciation
First name
Last name
Job title
Company
Phone number
Email address
Home page
Birthday
Instant messaging username
AIM
ICQ
XMPP
Windows Live Messenger
Yahoo! Messenger
Address
Related Names
Note

Contacts can search LDAP (network) directories. Users customize these in the LDAP tab of the preferences. Users search these by selecting Directories in the first pane, selecting a directory or All in the second pane, and typing their search in the search box above the top-left of the third pane. Results appear in the third pane.

See also
 Google Contacts
 People (Microsoft service)

References

MacOS-only software made by Apple Inc.
Personal information managers
iOS software
iOS
IOS-based software made by Apple Inc.